The 1888 Colorado gubernatorial election was held on November 6, 1888. Republican nominee Job Adams Cooper defeated Democratic nominee Thomas M. Patterson with 53.84% of the vote.

General election

Candidates
Major party candidates
Job Adams Cooper, Republican
Thomas M. Patterson, Democratic

Other candidates
William C. Stover, Prohibition
Gilbert De La Matyr, Greenback

Results

References

1888
Colorado
Gubernatorial